The Alton Bridge was a railroad bridge that carried the Chicago, Burlington, and Quincy (later Burlington Northern) across the Mississippi River between West Alton, Missouri, and Alton, Illinois. It was located  upriver from, and parallel to, the Old Clark Bridge. The bridge was built between 1892 and 1894 and was removed shortly after the line was abandoned in 1988.

See also
List of bridges documented by the Historic American Engineering Record in Illinois
List of bridges documented by the Historic American Engineering Record in Missouri
List of crossings of the Upper Mississippi River
Lock and Dam No. 26 (historical)

External links
Bridgehunter

Railroad bridges in Illinois
Railroad bridges in Missouri
St. Charles, Missouri
Alton, Illinois
Historic American Engineering Record in Illinois
Historic American Engineering Record in Missouri
Interstate railroad bridges in the United States
Pratt truss bridges in the United States
Swing bridges in the United States
Metal bridges in the United States
Pennsylvania truss bridges in the United States
Bridges in Madison County, Illinois 
Buildings and structures in St. Charles County, Missouri